Albert Ernest Salkeld (24 May 1876 – 26 May 1917) was an Australian rules footballer who played for the Essendon Football Club in the Victorian Football League (VFL).
		
A surgeon by profession, he later moved to England and enlisted to serve in World War I in the Royal Army Medical Corps. He died in London in 1917, but this was not related to his military service.

Notes

External links 
		

1876 births
1917 deaths
Australian rules footballers from Victoria (Australia)
Essendon Football Club players
British Army personnel of World War I
Royal Army Medical Corps soldiers